Rome Rankin (August 11, 1900 – June 1981) was an American football and basketball coach.

Eastern Kentucky University
He served as the head football coach at Eastern Kentucky University from 1935 to 1942 and from 1945 to 1946. He was also the school's head men's basketball coach from 1935 to 1943 and from 1944 to 1946.

University of Kentucky
While Eastern Kentucky University put their athletic program on hiatus during World War II, Rankin served as an assistant to basketball coach Adolph Rupp at the University of Kentucky for one season (1943–1944).

University of Maine
He served as the head basketball coach at the University of Maine from 1949 to 1954 He also served as an assistant football coach during his early tenure.

References

1900 births
1981 deaths
Eastern Kentucky Colonels football coaches
Eastern Kentucky Colonels men's basketball coaches
Kentucky Wildcats men's basketball coaches
Maine Black Bears athletic directors
Maine Black Bears football coaches
Maine Black Bears men's basketball coaches
University of Kentucky alumni